In computing, a benchmark is the act of running a computer program, a set of programs, or other operations, in order to assess the relative performance of an object, normally by running a number of standard tests and trials against it.
The term benchmark is also commonly utilized for the purposes of elaborately designed benchmarking programs themselves.

Benchmarking is usually associated with assessing performance characteristics of computer hardware, for example, the floating point operation performance of a CPU, but there are circumstances when the technique is also applicable to software. Software benchmarks are, for example, run against compilers or database management systems (DBMS).

Benchmarks provide a method of comparing the performance of various subsystems across different chip/system architectures.

Purpose 
As computer architecture advanced, it became more difficult to compare the performance of various computer systems simply by looking at their specifications. Therefore, tests were developed that allowed comparison of different architectures. For example, Pentium 4 processors generally operated at a higher clock frequency than Athlon XP or PowerPC processors, which did not necessarily translate to more computational power; a processor with a slower clock frequency might perform as well as or even better than a processor operating at a higher frequency. See BogoMips and the megahertz myth.

Benchmarks are designed to mimic a particular type of workload on a component or system. Synthetic benchmarks do this by specially created programs that impose the workload on the component. Application benchmarks run real-world programs on the system. While application benchmarks usually give a much better measure of real-world performance on a given system, synthetic benchmarks are useful for testing individual components, like a hard disk or networking device.

Benchmarks are particularly important in CPU design, giving processor architects the ability to measure and make tradeoffs in microarchitectural decisions. For example, if a benchmark extracts the key algorithms of an application, it will contain the performance-sensitive aspects of that application. Running this much smaller snippet on a cycle-accurate simulator can give clues on how to improve performance.

Prior to 2000, computer and microprocessor architects used SPEC to do this, although SPEC's Unix-based benchmarks were quite lengthy and thus unwieldy to use intact.

Computer manufacturers are known to configure their systems to give unrealistically high performance on benchmark tests that are not replicated in real usage. For instance, during the 1980s some compilers could detect a specific mathematical operation used in a well-known floating-point benchmark and replace the operation with a faster mathematically equivalent operation. However, such a transformation was rarely useful outside the benchmark until the mid-1990s, when RISC and VLIW architectures emphasized the importance of compiler technology as it related to performance. Benchmarks are now regularly used by compiler companies to improve not only their own benchmark scores, but real application performance.

CPUs that have many execution units — such as a superscalar CPU, a VLIW CPU, or a reconfigurable computing CPU — typically have slower clock rates than a sequential CPU with one or two execution units when built from transistors that are just as fast. Nevertheless, CPUs with many execution units often complete real-world and benchmark tasks in less time than the supposedly faster high-clock-rate CPU.

Given the large number of benchmarks available, a manufacturer can usually find at least one benchmark that shows its system will outperform another system; the other systems can be shown to excel with a different benchmark.

Manufacturers commonly report only those benchmarks (or aspects of benchmarks) that show their products in the best light. They also have been known to mis-represent the significance of benchmarks, again to show their products in the best possible light. Taken together, these practices are called bench-marketing.

Ideally benchmarks should only substitute for real applications if the application is unavailable, or too difficult or costly to port to a specific processor or computer system. If performance is critical, the only benchmark that matters is the target environment's application suite.

Functionality 
Features of benchmarking software may include recording/exporting the course of performance to a spreadsheet file, visualization such as drawing line graphs or color-coded tiles, and pausing the process to be able to resume without having to start over. Software can have additional features specific to its purpose, for example, disk benchmarking software may be able to optionally start measuring the disk speed within a specified range of the disk rather than the full disk, measure random access reading speed and latency, have a "quick scan" feature which measures the speed through samples of specified intervals and sizes, and allow specifying a data block size, meaning the number of requested bytes per read request.

Challenges 
Benchmarking is not easy and often involves several iterative rounds in order to arrive at predictable, useful conclusions. Interpretation of benchmarking data is also extraordinarily difficult. Here is a partial list of common challenges:

 Vendors tend to tune their products specifically for industry-standard benchmarks. Norton SysInfo (SI) is particularly easy to tune for, since it mainly biased toward the speed of multiple operations. Use extreme caution in interpreting such results.
 Some vendors have been accused of "cheating" at benchmarks — doing things that give much higher benchmark numbers, but make things worse on the actual likely workload.
 Many benchmarks focus entirely on the speed of computational performance, neglecting other important features of a computer system, such as:
 Qualities of service, aside from raw performance. Examples of unmeasured qualities of service include security, availability, reliability, execution integrity, serviceability, scalability (especially the ability to quickly and nondisruptively add or reallocate capacity), etc. There are often real trade-offs between and among these qualities of service, and all are important in business computing. Transaction Processing Performance Council Benchmark specifications partially address these concerns by specifying ACID property tests, database scalability rules, and service level requirements.
 In general, benchmarks do not measure Total cost of ownership. Transaction Processing Performance Council Benchmark specifications partially address this concern by specifying that a price/performance metric must be reported in addition to a raw performance metric, using a simplified TCO formula. However, the costs are necessarily only partial, and vendors have been known to price specifically (and only) for the benchmark, designing a highly specific "benchmark special" configuration with an artificially low price. Even a tiny deviation from the benchmark package results in a much higher price in real world experience.
 Facilities burden (space, power, and cooling). When more power is used, a portable system will have a shorter battery life and require recharging more often. A server that consumes more power and/or space may not be able to fit within existing data center resource constraints, including cooling limitations. There are real trade-offs as most semiconductors require more power to switch faster. See also performance per watt.
 In some embedded systems, where memory is a significant cost, better code density can significantly reduce costs.
 Vendor benchmarks tend to ignore requirements for development, test, and disaster recovery computing capacity. Vendors only like to report what might be narrowly required for production capacity in order to make their initial acquisition price seem as low as possible.
 Benchmarks are having trouble adapting to widely distributed servers, particularly those with extra sensitivity to network topologies. The emergence of grid computing, in particular, complicates benchmarking since some workloads are "grid friendly", while others are not.
 Users can have very different perceptions of performance than benchmarks may suggest. In particular, users appreciate predictability — servers that always meet or exceed service level agreements. Benchmarks tend to emphasize mean scores (IT perspective), rather than maximum worst-case response times (real-time computing perspective), or low standard deviations (user perspective).
 Many server architectures degrade dramatically at high (near 100%) levels of usage — "fall off a cliff" — and benchmarks should (but often do not) take that factor into account. Vendors, in particular, tend to publish server benchmarks at continuous at about 80% usage — an unrealistic situation — and do not document what happens to the overall system when demand spikes beyond that level.
 Many benchmarks focus on one application, or even one application tier, to the exclusion of other applications. Most data centers are now implementing virtualization extensively for a variety of reasons, and benchmarking is still catching up to that reality where multiple applications and application tiers are concurrently running on consolidated servers.
 There are few (if any) high quality benchmarks that help measure the performance of batch computing, especially high volume concurrent batch and online computing. Batch computing tends to be much more focused on the predictability of completing long-running tasks correctly before deadlines, such as end of month or end of fiscal year. Many important core business processes are batch-oriented and probably always will be, such as billing.
 Benchmarking institutions often disregard or do not follow basic scientific method. This includes, but is not limited to: small sample size, lack of variable control, and the limited repeatability of results.

Benchmarking Principles 
There are seven vital characteristics for benchmarks. These key properties are:
 Relevance: Benchmarks should measure relatively vital features.
 Representativeness: Benchmark performance metrics should be broadly accepted by industry and academia.
 Equity: All systems should be fairly compared.
 Repeatability: Benchmark results can be verified.
 Cost-effectiveness: Benchmark tests are economical.
 Scalability: Benchmark tests should work across systems possessing a range of resources from low to high.
 Transparency: Benchmark metrics should be easy to understand.

Types of benchmark 
Real program
word processing software
tool software of CAD
user's application software (i.e.: MIS)
Video games
Compilers building a large project, for example Chromium browser or Linux kernel
Component Benchmark / Microbenchmark
core routine consists of a relatively small and specific piece of code.
measure performance of a computer's basic components
may be used for automatic detection of computer's hardware parameters like number of registers, cache size, memory latency, etc.
Kernel
contains key codes
normally abstracted from actual program
popular kernel: Livermore loop
linpack benchmark (contains basic linear algebra subroutine written in FORTRAN language)
results are represented in Mflop/s.
Synthetic Benchmark
Procedure for programming synthetic benchmark:
take statistics of all types of operations from many application programs
get proportion of each operation
write program based on the proportion above
Types of Synthetic Benchmark are:
Whetstone
Dhrystone
These were the first general purpose industry standard computer benchmarks. They do not necessarily obtain high scores on modern pipelined computers.
 I/O benchmarks
 Database benchmarks
 measure the throughput and response times of database management systems (DBMS)
 Parallel benchmarks
 used on machines with multiple cores and/or processors, or systems consisting of multiple machines

Common benchmarks

Industry standard (audited and verifiable) 
 Business Applications Performance Corporation (BAPCo)
 Embedded Microprocessor Benchmark Consortium (EEMBC)
 Standard Performance Evaluation Corporation (SPEC), in particular their SPECint and SPECfp
 Transaction Processing Performance Council (TPC): DBMS benchmarks

Open source benchmarks 
 AIM Multiuser Benchmark – composed of a list of tests that could be mixed to create a ‘load mix’ that would simulate a specific computer function on any UNIX-type OS.
 Bonnie++ – filesystem and hard drive benchmark
 BRL-CAD – cross-platform architecture-agnostic benchmark suite based on multithreaded ray tracing performance; baselined against a VAX-11/780; and used since 1984 for evaluating relative CPU performance, compiler differences, optimization levels, coherency, architecture differences, and operating system differences.
 Collective Knowledge – customizable, cross-platform framework to crowdsource benchmarking and optimization of user workloads (such as deep learning) across hardware provided by volunteers
 Coremark – Embedded computing benchmark
 DEISA Benchmark Suite – scientific HPC applications benchmark
 Dhrystone – integer arithmetic performance, often reported in DMIPS (Dhrystone millions of instructions per second)
 DiskSpd – Command-line tool for storage benchmarking that generates a variety of requests against computer files, partitions or storage devices
 Fhourstones – an integer benchmark
 HINT – designed to measure overall CPU and memory performance
 Iometer – I/O subsystem measurement and characterization tool for single and clustered systems.
 IOzone – Filesystem benchmark
 LINPACK benchmarks – traditionally used to measure FLOPS
 Livermore loops
 NAS parallel benchmarks
 NBench – synthetic benchmark suite measuring performance of integer arithmetic, memory operations, and floating-point arithmetic
 PAL – a benchmark for realtime physics engines
 PerfKitBenchmarker – A set of benchmarks to measure and compare cloud offerings.
 Phoronix Test Suite – open-source cross-platform benchmarking suite for Linux, OpenSolaris, FreeBSD, OSX and Windows. It includes a number of other benchmarks included on this page to simplify execution.
 POV-Ray – 3D render
 Tak (function) – a simple benchmark used to test recursion performance
 TATP Benchmark – Telecommunication Application Transaction Processing Benchmark
 TPoX – An XML transaction processing benchmark for XML databases
 VUP (VAX unit of performance) – also called VAX MIPS
 Whetstone – floating-point arithmetic performance, often reported in millions of Whetstone instructions per second (MWIPS)

Microsoft Windows benchmarks 
 BAPCo: MobileMark, SYSmark, WebMark
 CrystalDiskMark
 Underwriters Laboratories (UL): 3DMark, PCMark
Heaven Benchmark
 PiFast
Superposition Benchmark
Super PI
 SuperPrime
Valley Benchmark
 Whetstone
 Windows System Assessment Tool, included with Windows Vista and later releases, providing an index for consumers to rate their systems easily
 Worldbench (discontinued)

Others 
 AnTuTu – commonly used on phones and ARM-based devices.
 Geekbench – A cross-platform benchmark for Windows, Linux, macOS, iOS and Android.
 iCOMP – the Intel comparative microprocessor performance, published by Intel
 Khornerstone
 Performance Rating – modeling scheme used by AMD and Cyrix to reflect the relative performance usually compared to competing products.
 SunSpider – a browser speed test
 VMmark – a virtualization benchmark suite.

See also 

 Benchmarking (business perspective)
 Figure of merit
 Lossless compression benchmarks
 Performance Counter Monitor
 Test suite a collection of test cases intended to show that a software program has some specified set of behaviors

References

Further reading

External links 
  The dates: 1962-1976